This is a list of hospitals in the Commonwealth of Virginia in the United States, sorted by hospital name.

References

Virginia
 
Hospitals